RAW is a young adult novel by Australian author Scott Monk. First published by Random House Australia in 1998, it has been reprinted eleven times. RAW is a tale of a teenager named Brett Dalton who has been sentenced to three months at The Farm for a break and enter charge. Brett learns a lot about himself during his time at The Cotton Farm. While there he finds love, he makes some new friends and he also manages to gain some enemies.

Characters

Brett Anthony Dalton is the main character who ‘doesn’t live by the rules’, sent to The Farm on break and enter charges. Throughout the book the reader gets more of an insight into why Brett acts the way he does. He doesn't like authority figures such as Sam or the Police. This causes him to keep Tyson's bullying to himself and to not report the man who stole his stuff from him. (p. 57)
Sam Fraser runs and owns The Farm. He puts full trust in all of the boys who come to the farm. It is their decision whether they will use or abuse this trust.
Mary is Sams wife, she also helps to run The Farm.
Robbie Scully (Frog) is Brett's 12-year-old roommate (p. 34) . He is at The Farm because of shop lifting offences (p. 123). Throughout the book a brother-like relationship forms between Brett and Frog (Robbie). This leads to Brett defending Frog (p. 182).
Josh Collins is an Aboriginal boy who is at The Farm by choice. He is working at The Farm to earn money to go to university but he still has to abide by the same rules and discipline as the other boys at The Farm.
Caitlyn Douglas is a young teenage girl who works at "Thompson's store". She often drops off supplies to The Farm.  It is here she meets Brett. Subsequently, they take every chance that is given to see each other.
Rebecca Sharpe was Brett's on-again, off-again girlfriend from home. They unexpectedly meet up when the Rodeo comes to town.
Tyson Jones is the resident bully of the Farm. He is a large pacific islander, 180 tall with a shaved head, tattooed arms and ears covered with earrings. Tyson represents a path Brett is slowly going down, he uses his size to intimidate others at the farm when Brett doesn't get intimidated, Tyson pulls a sharp knife and gets into trouble with Sam and the police.

Plot
The book RAW is the story of Brett Dalton's experience at The Farm, a detention/rehab centre, after being caught breaking into a liquor store at night and stealing alcohol, cigarettes, cash and condoms. When he gets to The Farm after an awful, hot, dehydrated trip in the back of a paddy wagon, he is determined not to cooperate or enjoy himself. This does not work in his favour. On meeting most of the inmates Brett makes enemies. He has confrontations with both of the “main guys” in the detention centre, Josh and Tyson. On the first night he decides he's going to run away. He sneaks out at night and plans on hitch-hiking to civilisation but the first car that picks him up is Sam. After being on the run, and realising how hard his plan is he decides on going back to The Farm. Then he tries skipping class, (which is compulsory). When he doesn't succeed he starts arguing with the teacher and gets sent out of class, which is just what he wants. He nicks off to behind the wood work shed to have a smoke, and spots a girl carrying supplies from a truck into the kitchen, he is stunned by her beauty. Eventually he meets this girl, Caitlyn and later they become more than friends. Brett meets up with his ex-girlfrienand crashing Sam's ute. This led to Sam and Brett constantly fighting and Sam ends up sending Brett the magistrate. When Brett realises that he only has five days left in town he wants to 'make things right' with Caitlyn. This doesn't go well and leaves Brett more heart-broken and angry. Before he leaves town, Brett is forced to go the big Ride (a cattle drive). On the Ride Josh and Brett get paired and learn more about each other. Brett learns the real reason that Josh is at The Farm, he was raped. Brett is later re-arrested by the cops for his newest crimes, the novel ends with Sam telling Brett that one can only change their own life. Brett now considers Sam to be an old friend of his. Brett also finds out that he has lost something and gained another.

Setting
Most of RAW takes place at The Farm, a detention centre for adolescent boys.  The Farm is located near Mungindi and Moree, Mungindi is a town on the border of New South Wales and Queensland in rural Australia.  This setting plays an active part in the story, as the heat, landscape, droughts and floods associated with rural Australia play a crucial part of the plot. There is also a scene at the beach Australia test.

References

Australian young adult novels
1998 novels